Malene Vahl Rasmussen (born 22 November 1994) is a Greenlandic politician, and a member of the Inatsisartut.

References 

1994 births
Living people
Women members of the Parliament of Greenland
Members of the Parliament of Greenland
People from Nuuk